Glenea flava is a species of beetle in the family Cerambycidae. It was described by Karl Jordan in 1895.

References

flava
Beetles described in 1895